The New Orleans Privateers men's basketball team represents the University of New Orleans in New Orleans, Louisiana, United States. The school's team currently competes as a member of the Southland Conference. They are currently led by head coach Mark Slessinger and play their home games at Lakefront Arena.

Coach Slessinger is the fourth native Hoosier to lead the Privateer program, joining Ron Greene (1969-1976), Don Smith (1979-1985) and Monte Towe (2001-2006).

Head coaches

Reference:

Season results

References:

Postseason appearances

NCAA Division I Tournament results
The Privateers have appeared in the NCAA Division I Tournament five times. Their combined record is 1–5.

National Invitational Tournament (NIT) results
The Privateers have appeared in the National Invitation Tournament (NIT) six times. Their combined record is 4–6.

College Basketball Invitational (CBI) results
The Privateers have appeared in the College Basketball Invitational (CBI) once. Their combined record is 1–1.

CollegeInsider.com Tournament (CIT) results
The Privateers have appeared in the CollegeInsider.com Tournament (CIT) once. Their combined record is 0–1.

The Basketball Classic results
The Privateers have appeared in The Basketball Classic one time. Their record is 0–1.

NCAA Division II Tournament results
The Privateers have appeared in the NCAA Division II Tournament four times. Their combined record is 9–6.

Notable players

Retired jerseys 
On December 29, 1997, the Privateers retired their first jersey, Ervin Johnson's number 40.

See also
List of NCAA Division I men's basketball programs

References

External links